Norma Luz Irene Duarte Palafox (born 14 October 1998), known as Norma Duarte or Norma Palafox, is a Mexican professional footballer who plays as a forward for Liga MX Femenil club Cruz Azul.

Club career

Guadalajara
On 3 May 2017, Palafox made her debut for Guadalajara in a 6–1 loss to Pachuca in the Copa MX Femenil. On 29 July, she made her first Liga MX Femenil appearance in a 3–0 home victory against Atlas. On 3 September, she scored her first goal in a 6–0 win over Santos Laguna. In the first leg of the 2017 Apertura final on 20 November, Guadalajara were beaten 2–0 by Pachuca, but two goals from Arlett Tovar and one from Palafox helped them win 3–0 the second leg on 24 November, and consequently the first ever Liga MX Femenil title. Palafox finished the 2017 Apertura with 8 goals in 18 total appearances. She left the team shortly to participate in a reality show  Upon finishing she returned to the team signing a new contract. In 2021 she left the team to play in Telemundo's Exatlon United States.

Pachuca
On 20 December 2020, Palafox was transferred to Pachuca.

Atlas
On 21 June 2022, Palafox was signed by Atlas.

International career

Youth national teams
On 27 November 2017, Palafox received her first call-up to the under-20 national team. She was part of the team that won the 2018 CONCACAF Women's U-20 Championship. She made one appearance in the tournament in a 2–1 loss to the United States on 23 January 2018.

Career statistics

Club
.

Honors and awards

Club
Guadalajara
 Liga MX Femenil: Apertura 2017

Individual
 Liga MX Femenil Team of The Season: Apertura 2017

International
Mexico U20
 CONCACAF Women's U-20 Championship: 2018

References

External links
 

1998 births
Living people
Mexican women's footballers
Footballers from Sonora
Sportspeople from Hermosillo
Liga MX Femenil players
Atlas F.C. (women) footballers
C.D. Guadalajara (women) footballers
Women's association football forwards
Mexican footballers